Brown Township is one of nine townships in Hancock County, Indiana, United States. As of the 2010 census, its population was 2,571 and it contained 1,067 housing units.

History
Brown Township was organized in 1833. It was named for Prior Brown, a pioneer settler.

Geography
The streams of Harlan Run, Maize Run, McCray Run, Shirley Drain and Village Brook run through this township.

Cities and towns
 Shirley (west three-quarters)
 Wilkinson

Unincorporated towns
 Nashville
 Warrington
 Willow Branch
(This list is based on USGS data and may include former settlements.)

Adjacent townships
 Adams Township, Madison County (north)
 Greensboro Township, Henry County (east)
 Harrison Township, Henry County (east)
 Wayne Township, Henry County (southeast)
 Jackson Township (south)
 Green Township (west)
 Fall Creek Township, Madison County (northwest)

Cemeteries
The township contains five cemeteries: McCray, Harlan, Hayes (twp), Gard (twp) and Reeves (twp).

Major highways
  Indiana State Road 109
  Indiana State Road 234

References
 
 United States Census Bureau cartographic boundary files

External links
 Indiana Township Association
 United Township Association of Indiana
 

Townships in Hancock County, Indiana
Townships in Indiana